Charles II (10 April 1651, in Heidelberg – 26 May 1685, in Heidelberg) was Elector Palatine from 1680 to 1685.  He was the son of Charles I Louis, Elector Palatine, and Charlotte of Hesse-Kassel.

Rule 
His short reign was not glamorous. He appointed his incompetent former tutor Paul Hachenberg as chief minister, leaving his half-siblings, the "Raugraves", out of favour. He brought back his mother from Kassel and paid her immense debts. Charles was of a weak and timid nature, marked by familial childhood experiences. He showed a superficial enthusiasm for military life. Charles was a strict Calvinist. In 1671, his aunt, Electress Sophia of Hanover, arranged his marriage to Princess Wilhelmine Ernestine of Denmark, daughter of King Frederick III of Denmark. Their marriage was childless.

Upon his death, the Electoral Palatinate passed to the Catholic Neuburg branch of the family.  The rival claims to the Palatinate of his sister, Elizabeth Charlotte, Duchess of Orleans, Louis XIV of France's sister-in-law, was the pretext for the French invasion of the Palatinate in 1688, which began the Nine Years War.

Ancestry

References

1651 births
1685 deaths
Nobility from Heidelberg
House of Palatinate-Simmern
Prince-electors of the Palatinate
Burials at the Church of the Holy Spirit, Heidelberg